Richard Jackett (1 December 1880 – 27 July 1960) was a Cornish rugby union player who played his club rugby for Falmouth R.F.C. and between 1905-14 Leicester Tigers where he made 59 appearances scoring 8 tries. He was capped 71 times for Cornwall and was a member of the 1908 County Championship winning team that beat Durham 17-3 in the final played at Redruth in front of 17,000 spectators.  He also played in the Cornwall side that represented Great Britain winning a silver medal in the 1908 Summer Olympics at White City Stadium, London losing to Australia in the final 32-3. He was the brother of Edward Jackett.

See also

 Rugby union in Cornwall
 Rugby union at the 1908 Summer Olympics

References

External links
 Profile

1880 births
1960 deaths
Cornish rugby union players
English rugby union players
Leicester Tigers players
Olympic rugby union players of Great Britain
Olympic silver medallists for Great Britain
Rugby union players at the 1908 Summer Olympics
Rugby union players from Falmouth, Cornwall